The 1988 Individual Ice Speedway World Championship was the 23rd edition of the World Championship  The Championship was held on 12 and 13 March 1988 in Eindhoven in the Netherlands. 

The winner was Erik Stenlund of Sweden for the second time. He beat Yuri Ivanov by two points to stop Ivanov from claiming a third consecutive title.

Classification

See also 
 1988 Individual Speedway World Championship in classic speedway
 1988 Team Ice Racing World Championship

References 

Ice speedway competitions
World